This is a list of singles that charted in the top ten of the Billboard Hot 100, an all-genre singles chart, in 2019.

Top-ten singles

Key
 – indicates single's top 10 entry was also its Hot 100 debut
(#) – 2019 year-end top 10 single position and rank

2018 peaks

2020 peaks

Holiday season

"It's the Most Wonderful Time of the Year" by Andy Williams also made the top ten for the first time during the 2018–19 season (on December 29, 2018), but never made a top ten appearance on any Hot 100 chart dated in 2019.

Notes 
Billy Ray Cyrus started being credited as a featured artist from the week ending April 20, 2019.

The single re-entered the top ten on the week ending January 12, 2019.
The single re-entered the top ten on the week ending February 23, 2019.
The single re-entered the top ten on the week ending March 9, 2019.
The single re-entered the top ten on the week ending March 16, 2019.
The single re-entered the top ten on the week ending March 30, 2019.
The single re-entered the top ten on the week ending April 6, 2019.
The single re-entered the top ten on the week ending April 27, 2019.
The single re-entered the top ten on the week ending May 4, 2019.
The single re-entered the top ten on the week ending May 25, 2019.
The single re-entered the top ten on the week ending July 13, 2019.
The single re-entered the top ten on the week ending July 27, 2019.
The single re-entered the top ten on the week ending August 3, 2019.
The single re-entered the top ten on the week ending August 10, 2019.
The single re-entered the top ten on the week ending August 24, 2019.
The single re-entered the top ten on the week ending September 7, 2019.
The single re-entered the top ten on the week ending September 14, 2019.
The single re-entered the top ten on the week ending September 21, 2019.
The single re-entered the top ten on the week ending September 28, 2019.
The single re-entered the top ten on the week ending November 2, 2019.
The single re-entered the top ten on the week ending November 16, 2019.
The single re-entered the top ten on the week ending December 14, 2019.
The single re-entered the top ten on the week ending December 21, 2019.
The single re-entered the top ten on the week ending December 28, 2019.

See also 
 2019 in American music
 List of Billboard Hot 100 number ones of 2019
 List of number-one streaming songs of 2019

References

External links
Billboard.com
Billboard.biz
The Billboard Hot 100

United States Hot 100 Top Ten Singles
2019